The Trixy Liberty is an Austrian autogyro designed and produced by Trixy Aviation Products of Dornbirn. The aircraft is supplied complete and ready-to-fly.

Design and development
The Liberty was designed as an entry-level, open cockpit gyroplane, although it has an optional cabin canopy enclosure. It features a single main rotor, a two-seats-in tandem open cockpit with a windshield, tricycle landing gear without wheel pants, plus a tail caster and a four-cylinder, liquid and air-cooled, four stroke  Rotax 912 or turbocharged  Rotax 914 engine in pusher configuration.

The aircraft fuselage is made from composites.

Unlike many other autogyro builders, Trixy Aviation uses a swash plate in its rotor head designs, rather than a tilt head. This makes the design more sensitive to fly and requires special type training.

Specifications (Liberty)

See also
List of rotorcraft

References

External links

Liberty
2010s Austrian sport aircraft
Single-engined pusher autogyros